Sacramento River National Wildlife Refuge is located along the Sacramento River in the Sacramento Valley of California. Landscape is very flat, bordered by the Sierra and Coast ranges, with intensive agriculture (rice, with walnut, almond, and prune orchards along the river). This riparian community is one of the most important wildlife habitats in California and North America.

The refuge is currently in an active acquisition phase, and includes the Llano Seco Unit. Large-scale riparian habitat restoration is ongoing. Riparian habitat along the Sacramento River is critically important for various threatened species, fisheries, migratory birds, plants, and the natural system of the river itself.

Restoration

There has been an 85% reduction of riparian vegetation throughout the Sacramento Valley and foothills region, and probably over a 95 percent reduction along this area's major river systems. The relatively small amount of Riparian forest woodlands that remains provides a strikingly disproportionate amount of habitat value for wildlife.

References
Refuge profile
Refuge website

External links

National Wildlife Refuges in California
Sacramento River
Natural history of the Central Valley (California)
Protected areas of Butte County, California
Protected areas of Glenn County, California
Protected areas of Tehama County, California
Protected areas established in 1989
1989 establishments in California